Amatlán de los Reyes is a municipality in Veracruz, Mexico. It is located about 105.63 mi from state capital Xalapa to the south. It has an area of 148.9 km2.

The municipality is delimited to the north by Córdoba Municipality and Atoyac Municipality, to the east by Atoyac  Municipality and Yanga Municipality, to the south by Cuichapa Municipality and to the east by Córdoba  Municipality,

Products
It produces maize and beans.

Temple
The Temple of the Gentleman of the Sanctuary is located in the town. Its construction dates back to the 18th century. In its main cover they emphasize its fluted pilasters, reliefs of tiara and keys in the spandrels, as well as niches in the interpilasters. The closing is mixtilineal with three medallions to the center with reliefs of an angel, excels the mixtilineal window remetida, surrounded by abundant vegetal decoration.

References

External links 
  Municipal Official Site
  Municipal Official Information

Municipalities of Veracruz